The Upright Citizens Brigade Theatre (shorter UCB Theatre) is an American improvisational theatre company and training center founded by the Upright Citizens Brigade troupe members Matt Besser, Amy Poehler, Ian Roberts and Matt Walsh.

Prior to the COVID-19 pandemic, UCB had locations in the New York City neighborhoods of Hell's Kitchen and the East Village, and on Sunset Boulevard in Los Angeles. UCB was located in Chelsea West 26th Street location from April 2003 until November 2017, after which it moved to Hell's Kitchen, 555 West 42nd Street in December 2017. The second NYC theatre located in the East Village opened in 2011, and the Los Angeles expansion started in 2014.

Members of the Upright Citizens Brigade originally trained with Del Close at Chicago's ImprovOlympic where they created their signature ASSSSCAT show, the success of which led to the troupe founding the UCB Theatre in New York City.

Philosophy
The Upright Citizens Brigade Theatre Training Center teaches long form improv, sketch, writing, parts of directing, and various other comedy skills.  The training center's philosophy of improv is based largely on the teachings of Del Close, with a strong emphasis on the "game" of the scene. In 2013, they co-authored a manual titled The Upright Citizens Brigade Comedy Improvisation Manual. The primary improvisational form is "The Harold", and the theater in all its incarnations has had a group of "Harold Teams", house teams that perform regularly.

History

New York
Prior to opening their own theatre, the Upright Citizens Brigade performed their signature improv show, ASSSSCAT, first at KGB Bar, and then later at Solo Arts. Solo Arts was the first semi-permanent home to the Upright Citizens Brigade's Harold Teams and is considered by some to be the group's first theatre. The troupe's first permanent space was at 161 West 22nd Street, a 75-seat auditorium that used to be the Harmony Burlesque Theater, an all-nude lap-dancing club—essentially a storefront. The original theatre was closed on November 18, 2002, after a building inspector ordered the theater to be shut down due to fire code violations. In the months that followed, the theater found a temporary home at the Access Theater on lower Broadway, then moved to the Chelsea Playhouse for a short time before finding a permanent space.

On April 1, 2003, the Upright Citizens Brigade Theatre moved to its second official space in Chelsea, a 150-seat theater at 307 West 26th Street in NYC in the former Maverick Theater. The new venue had several advantages over the previous theater on 22nd Street, such as double capacity, a more professional tech booth, larger green room with a greater separation from the stage area, two dressing rooms, storage rooms, twice the number of bathrooms, and a "chill out room".

In September 2011, UCB opened a second theater on the Lower East Side of Manhattan, at 153 E 3rd St. This theater features 124 seats, two lobbies, and a full bar known as the "Hot Chicks Room" in reference to an episode of the Upright Citizens Brigade TV show. Often referred to as "Beast", the theater was initially opened in hopes of showcasing more stand-up comedy. However, it primarily featured improv and sketch shows. In January 2019 it was announced that UCB East would close in February 2019, following financial issues.

At the start of 2017, ticket prices increased (the first in ten years). In October 2017, it was announced that the UCB Chelsea location would close. The last show in Chelsea was Wednesday, November 28, 2017.  The next UCB space was at 555 42nd Street in Hell's Kitchen, the former home to the Pearl Theatre Company. Due to the COVID-19 pandemic, this location and the New York training center were closed on Tuesday, April 21, 2020, leaving no NYC locations of UCB, with no confirmed plans for revival.

Los Angeles
In 2005, the Los Angeles branch of the theater opened at 5919 Franklin Avenue in Hollywood, offering up improv, sketch and stand-up comedy shows nightly with a 120-seat capacity. Soon after, Comedy Bang! Bang! (formerly Comedy Death-Ray), a Los Angeles alternative comedy show moved from its former home at the M Bar to join the Upright Citizens Brigade Theatre, appearing on Tuesday nights.

In 2014, UCB announced the opening of UCB Theatre Sunset located at 5419 Sunset Boulevard for November 1. The venue played home to Upright Citizens Brigade's training center, an 85-seat theatre, cafe/performance space called Inner Sanctum, video production offices, and even retail stores on street level. This location was sold in December 2020, leaving the Franklin theater as the only space owned by UCB.

In March 2022, former owner and CEO of The Onion, Mike McAvoy, and co-founder of Mosaic talent management, Jimmy Miller, acquired UCB and its lone remaining theater with the backing of venture capitalist, Elysian Park. They reopened the UCB comedy theater and Los Angeles training centers in September of 2022.

Notable performers 

 Aziz Ansari
 Matt Besser - founder
 Nicole Byer
 D'Arcy Carden
 Ilana Glazer
 Donald Glover
 Ed Helms
 Abbi Jacobson
 Ellie Kemper
 Nick Kroll
 Kate McKinnon
 Ego Nwodim
 Aubrey Plaza
 Amy Poehler - founder
 June Diane Raphael
 Rob Riggle
 Ian Roberts - founder
 Paul Scheer
 Gianni Paolo
 Ben Schwartz
 Matt Walsh - founder
 Zach Woods

See also

 Annoyance Theatre 
 The Groundlings
 iO Theater
 Improv Asylum
 Magnet Theater
 The Midnight Show
 The Peoples Improv Theater
 The Second City
 Under the Gun Theater

References

External links

Former theatres in Manhattan
Performance art in New York City
Improvisational theatre
Chelsea, Manhattan
East Village, Manhattan
2000s in comedy
2010s in comedy
2003 establishments in New York City
2014 establishments in California
Improv Theatre companies in New York City